The North Tyneside Loop refers to the railway lines in North Tyneside from Newcastle upon Tyne via Wallsend, North Shields, Whitley Bay, Backworth, Benton and South Gosforth back to Newcastle. Since the 1980s, it has formed part of the Tyne and Wear Metro, albeit in modified form.

History
The loop emerged from two competing railways which were built from Newcastle to Tynemouth, and was not completed until 1909: the southern leg of what became the loop was built by the Newcastle and North Shields Railway in 1839 from  via Wallsend; although initially terminating at North Shields, it was extended to Tynemouth in 1847.
 
Initially both railways had separate terminus stations at Tynemouth, but both lines had been taken over by the North Eastern Railway (NER) by the 1870s. In 1882, the NER built a new coastal route from Monkseaton to Tynemouth via Whitley Bay, abandoning the original Blyth and Tyne inland route, and this allowed both legs of the route to join head on at Tynemouth, where a new through station was opened. However the loop was still not completed, as the northern and southern legs of the route still ran into separate unconnected termini at Newcastle.

Electrification
The line was electrified (as the Tyneside Electrics) by the NER in 1904 to fight competition from the newly built electric tramways. In 1909 the loop was finally completed when the original Blyth & Tyne terminus at New Bridge Street was closed and a line built to connect the northern leg of the route to an extended  station. However the route was de-electrified in 1967, and converted to diesel multiple unit operation.

Tyne and Wear Metro

In the late 1970s the loop was converted to form part of the Tyne and Wear Metro, which opened in stages beginning in 1980. Both the northern and southern legs of the loop were diverted onto new underground routes on the approach to Newcastle, so that both legs of the loop now intersect at the underground Monument Metro station.
 

See also
 Riverside Branch

References

Tyne and Wear Metro
Railway lines in North East England